Galium noricum is a species of flowering plant in the family Rubiaceae. It is native to the eastern Alps of Austria, Slovenia, Bavaria and northern Italy (Veneto, Friuli-Venezia Giulia). The species is named for the ancient Roman Province of Noricum, which included most of present-day Austria and much of Slovenia.

Galium noricum is a small plant with shiny green leaves and cream-colored flowers.

References

External links
Botanik im Bild  /  Flora von Österreich, Liechtenstein und Südtirol, Norisch-Labkraut
Portale sulla Flora del Parco Nazionale del Triglav (Slovenia), Galium noricum

noricum
Flora of Italy
Flora of Austria
Flora of Germany
Flora of Slovenia
Flora of the Alps
Triglav National Park
Plants described in 1953